ABC was the first American television network to broadcast the Pan American Games in 1963, when they devoted one episode of their Wide World of Sports anthology program to the games. They doubled their coverage to two episodes of the show in 1967. CBS then bought the rights to the 1975 and 1979 Games at the same time. Their coverage in 1975 was mainly shown on CBS Sports Spectacular, their equivalent to Wide World of Sports. CBS repeated the process of airing most of its coverage on CBS Sports Spectacular in 1979.

For the 1983 games, CBS aired all of its coverage on weekend afternoons. These games also marked the first of three consecutive hosting assignments of Brent Musburger. CBS endured numerous obstacles in the run up to the games, including missing video tape machines and mobile units, inexperienced technicians from several countries, a last minute disagreement with the host broadcaster that left CBS scrambling to add 5 more cameras to the 3 it planned to use at the opening ceremony, and more. In addition, when a large doping scandal broke out at the games, including the sudden departure of 12 American athletes to avoid drug testing, Musburger made special reports on the scandal during the CBS Morning News and CBS Evening News, as well as during the regularly scheduled coverage.

CBS broadcast its fourth consecutive Pan American Games in 1987 and provided the host feed as well. This would be the last time that CBS would broadcast the games. Brent Musburger as previously alluded to, returned as host.

In 1991, ABC sought the rights to the Pan Am Games in Havana. The negotiations became bogged down in the U.S. embargo against Cuba, which forbade direct payments to Cuba. After a protracted negotiation with the U.S. Justice Department, ABC eventually signed a deal to broadcast the games. The fee was paid indirectly to avoid the embargo. ABC partnered with Ted Turner's TNT cable channel for the Havana games. TNT aired the prime time coverage with Ernie Johnson Jr. as host, while Brent Musburger (who had been fired by CBS in March 1990) anchored ABC's weekend afternoon coverage. This would be the last time the games were broadcast by a major broadcast network in the United States. All coverage since has aired on cable or Spanish-language networks.

In the United States, ESPN and ESPN Deportes held the broadcasting rights for the Pan American Games through 2019.

See also
List of Pan American Games commentators
List of 2015 Pan and Parapan American Games broadcasters
List of events broadcast on Wide World of Sports (American TV program)

References

External links
Sports / Non-ceremonial videos
HOW TO WATCH THE 2019 PAN AMERICAN GAMES
CBC/Radio Canada wins 2015 Pan American Games broadcast rights
CBC says it's 'very happy' with Pan Am TV ratings
2019 Pan Am Games | CBC Sports - CBC.ca
ESPN to Offer Multimedia Coverage of the XVIII Lima 2019 Pan American Games
Pan American Games airing on ESPN networks
ESPN pumps up Pan Am coverage - Sports Business Daily
MOVISTAR TV BECOMES THE OFFICIAL LIMA 2019 PAN-AMERICAN GAMES PAY TV BROADCASTER
TLN and Univision pick up Pan Am Games rights in host nation
Univision sets Pan Am packages
2011 Pan American Games to be broadcast by ESPN
From USEFNetwork.com to ESPN: Extensive Coverage of 2011 Pan American Games
ESPN Kicks Off Pan Am Games Coverage
Pan Am Games 2015 - ESPN - ESPN.com
ESPN Reaches Diverse Audience with Pan American Games Toronto 2015

 
ABC Sports
CBS Sports
Turner Sports
CBS Sports Spectacular
Wide World of Sports (American TV series)
ESPN
ESPN2
CBC Sports
Telefónica
Univision
History of sports broadcasting
Sports television in the United States
Sports television in Canada